This is a list of massacres that have taken place in Mali, Africa.

List of massacres

Post-2010

See also
 Timeline of the Mali war

References

Massacres in Mali
Human rights abuses in Mali
Mali War
21st-century mass murder in Africa